Daniel "Jack" McDonald  (1844 – November 23, 1880) was a professional baseball player who played outfield for the  Brooklyn Atlantics and Brooklyn Eckfords teams of the NAPBBP.

References

External links

1844 births
1880 deaths
19th-century baseball players
Brooklyn Atlantics players
Brooklyn Eckfords players
San Francisco Athletics players
19th-century deaths from tuberculosis
Tuberculosis deaths in New York (state)
Sportspeople from Brooklyn
Baseball players from New York City
Burials at Holy Cross Cemetery, Brooklyn